Madonna and Child with Four Saints may refer to:
 Madonna and Child with Four Saints (Moretto), a  painting by Moretto da Brescia
 Madonna and Child with Four Saints (Titian), a  painting by Titian

See also 
 Madonna and Child with Four Saints and Donor, a 1507 painting by Giovanni Bellini